Rudolf Lubinski (also spelled Lubynski; October 31, 1873 – March 27, 1935) was one of the greatest art nouveau Croatian architects. His most famous work is the Croatian State Archives building on Marulić Square in Zagreb.

Biography

Lubinski was born in Zagreb to a Croatian Jewish family Lubinski - Lövy. He studied at the Technische Hochschule university in Karlsruhe. After his education Lubinski worked in the architectural studio of Josef Durm, participating in the city projects of Offenburg, Cologne, Karlsruhe and Freiburg. Lubinski has participated in developing the project for the Heidelberg University Library, which came as a particularly good experience gained in the later work in Zagreb.

In 1907 Lubinski created his own studio in Zagreb. He has designed numerous residential houses in Nazorova, Petrinjska and Masarykova street. Some of Lubinski major projects are, the Lutheran Center in the Gundulićeva street (1909),  (1910) and building of insurance company in Mihanovićeva street (1928). Since 1911 until 1913 Lubinski worked on his biggest building project, the National and University Library on Marulić square in Zagreb.

Since 1926 until 1930 he worked on a project of Jewish synagogue in Sarajevo, Il Kal grandi. There were many architects employed in the studio of Rudolf Lubinski, who have since grown into the big names of Zagreb modern architecture. Some of them are; Stjepan Planić, Stjepan Gomboš, Juraj Neidhardt and many others. His last project was a commercial building in Gajeva street 5.

Rudolf Lubinski died in Zagreb on March 27, 1935 and was buried at the Mirogoj Cemetery.

References

Bibliography

 

1873 births
1935 deaths
Architects from Zagreb
Croatian Jews
Austro-Hungarian Jews
Croatian Austro-Hungarians
Jewish architects
Burials at Mirogoj Cemetery
Art Nouveau architects